Mitch is a masculine given name.

Mitch may also refer to:

 "Mitch" (Paul Heaton song), debut single by Paul Heaton
 Mitch, a 1984 British crime drama starring John Thaw

See also
 Mich (disambiguation)
 Hurricane Mitch (disambiguation)